The Surface Go 2 is a 2-in-1 detachable tablet computer developed by Microsoft. It is the second generation of Surface Go and was announced alongside the Surface Book 3 on May 6, 2020 online. It was available for purchase starting May 12, 2020. In October 2021, this has been superseded by the Surface Go 3.

Surface Go 2 keeps the same thin, lightweight design, but with a larger 10.5-inch display, an improved battery life and an improved performance, one particular model performs 64% faster than the original. It is the first time that an Intel Core m processor is offered in this small device.

The device runs Windows 10 Home in S Mode by default, but can be switched to the full version of Windows 10 Home for free (but not vice versa). It features the same 5 MP front-facing camera, 8 MP rear camera and an infrared camera, same as the previous model. A NFC chip and a kickstand supporting an angle of up to 165° are also present.

With a bigger display also comes with a bigger 1920 x 1280 resolution at 220 ppi, while still maintaining the 3:2 aspect ratio.

The Surface Go 2 starts at $399.99 and goes up to $729.99. Its detachable keyboard with touchpad and stylus pen are sold separately.

Configuration

Features

 Windows Hello with IR camera for facial recognition logging in.
 Faster processor with a 64% increase in performance for the top model.
 An Intel Pentium Gold and an Intel Core m3 CPU options with an Intel UHD Graphics 615 GPU.
 Memory options are 4 GB and 8 GB
 Storage options are 64 GB, 128 GB, and 256 GB.
 A headphone jack, a USB-C port, microSD card slot and a nano SIM card tray for the LTE model.
 All configurations can be upgraded to Windows 10 Pro for an additional $50.
 The 8.3 mm thick tablet weighs 544 grams (1.2 pounds).
 Up to 10 hours of typical device usage.

Hardware

The Surface Go 2 is the 5th addition to small Surface lineup. The Surface Go 2 is aimed toward children and students, it is also aimed for schools and the enterprise.

The Surface Go 2 features a bigger screen than its predecessor.  It features a full-body magnesium alloy construction. The device features a new and fanless powerful processor, an Intel Core m3 8th gen processor inside. The cheaper models will have an Intel Pentium Gold processor inside. 

The device contains USB C port with power delivery and a Surface Connect port. The front-facing camera contains an infrared sensor that supports login using Windows Hello.

The device's Type Cover uses an 8-pin connection which is compatible with the previous model. The keyboard is sold separately at $99.

Software 

Surface Go 2 models ship with a pre-installed 64-bit version of Windows 10 Home in S Mode and a 30-day trial of Microsoft 365. Users may only install software from Windows Store. Users can opt out of the S Mode of the OS and upgrade to Home for free or Pro for a fee and be able to install apps from outside the Windows Store.

Windows 10 comes pre-installed with Mail, Calendar, People, Xbox, Photos, Movies and TV, Groove, Your Phone, Office and Edge. The device also supports Windows Hello login using a biometric facial recognition.

Timeline

References

External links 

 
 

Microsoft Surface
Tablet computers introduced in 2020
2-in-1 PCs